Henry Ormond (May 27, 1901 - May 8, 1973) was a German lawyer. In 1946, Henry Ormond he was one of the founders of the news magazine Der Spiegel. He represented Nazi victims before German courts.

Henry Ormond died during a courtroom plea in 1973.

References

1901 births
1973 deaths
People from Mannheim
Der Spiegel people
20th-century publishers (people)
20th-century German lawyers
Emigrants from Nazi Germany